Phil Parker (born March 13, 1963) is the defensive coordinator for the Iowa Hawkeyes. A native of Lorain, Ohio, Parker was a first team all-Big Ten defensive back at Michigan State.

Playing career
Parker was a four-year letterman at Marion L. Steele High School in Amherst, Ohio from 1978 to 1981. He played halfback and defensive back, and returned punts and kickoffs.

Parker played defensive back for Michigan State. He was first team all-Big Ten in 1983, 1984, and 1985. Parker was defensive MVP at Michigan State in 1983 and 1985. Parker was also named MVP of the 1984 Cherry Bowl. He was invited to the Hula Bowl after his senior season.

Coaching career
Parker began his coaching career as a graduate assistant at Michigan State. He then spent 11 seasons as a defensive backs coach for the University of Toledo. Following the retirement of Hayden Fry, Parker joined the coaching staff of Kirk Ferentz at the University of Iowa in 1999. He then spent 13 years as the defensive backs coach before being promoted to defensive coordinator following the departure of Norm Parker.

Personal life
Parker received an undergraduate degree from Michigan State in 1986. He and his wife, Sandy, have two children.

References

External links
 Iowa profile

1963 births
Living people
American football defensive backs
Iowa Hawkeyes football coaches
Michigan State Spartans football coaches
Michigan State Spartans football players
Toledo Rockets football coaches
Sportspeople from Lorain, Ohio
Coaches of American football from Ohio
Players of American football from Ohio